George Sharpe or Sharp may refer to:

Sharpe
George H. Sharpe (1828–1900), lawyer, American Civil War general, politician
George Sharpe (footballer) (1912–1984), English footballer
George Sharpe (politician) (1908–1985), Canadian politician

Sharp
George G. Sharp, a marine design and naval architecture firm
George Sharp (cricketer) (born 1950), English cricketer and umpire
George Sharp (footballer) (born 1935), English footballer
George B. Sharp, Irish-American silversmith,
G. Kendall Sharp (born 1934), United States district judge
George Sharp, illustrator of e.g., of James Clavell's children' book Thrump-O-Moto (1986)